Jaap Siewertsz van Reesema (born 28 October 1984), professionally known as Jake Reese, is a Dutch singer-songwriter.

After winning the Dutch X Factor, Reesema collaborated with Hardwell on his singles "Run Wild" and "Mad World", for which he won the award for Best Vocal Performance at the 2015 IDMA's. He has also collaborated with Lost Frequencies, Hardwell & Jay Sean (as co-writer), David Guetta & Showtek (co-writer and singer), on the single "Your Love", KSHMR, on the single "Carry Me Home" (co-writer and singer), Brennan Heart, on the single "Lose It All", Sam Feldt, Topic, Lucas & Steve, Dash Berlin, Waka Flocka. In 2015 Jake wrote and sang the song "Day to Feel Alive" for the Ameriprise US campaign, which was also used as the opening song for the Anderson Cooper show on CNN for an entire season. For his solo project, Jake combined his dance background with the more raw/natural vibe of "Day to Feel Alive". His release "Ellie" with Belgium DJ Regi reached the number 1 spot for 7 weeks in Belgium.

Personal life
Jaap Reesema lives with his partner Kim Kötter, former Miss Universe Netherlands.

Discography

Albums

Singles
Credited as Jack Reese

Credited as Jaap Reesema

Songs featured in

Other songs
 David Guetta and Showtek –  "Your Love"
 Hardwell feat. Jay Sean – "Thinking About You"
 Sam Feldt feat. Jake Reese – "Blackbird"
 Lost Frequencies feat. Jake Reese – "Sky Is the Limit"
 Topic feat. Jake Reese – "Find You"
 KSHMR feat. Jake Reese – "Carry Me Home"
 Dash Berlin and DBSTF feat. Jake Reese, Waka Flocka – "Gold"
 Jake Reese – "Day to Feel Alive"
 Brennan Heart feat. Jake Reese – "Lose It All"
FAULHABER feat. Jake Reese – "Savannah"
 Scooter – "Encore"

Awards
X Factor winner 2010 (Netherlands)
 IDMA 2015 Best vocalist
 Ketnet award Best song of the Year 2018 - Regie feat. Jake Reese "Ellie"

References

Living people
1984 births
Dutch singer-songwriters
21st-century Dutch people